Gino Roy Pella (born 11 May 1930) is a Canadian athlete. He competed in the men's discus throw at the 1952 Summer Olympics.

References

1930 births
Living people
Athletes (track and field) at the 1952 Summer Olympics
Canadian male discus throwers
Olympic track and field athletes of Canada
Place of birth missing (living people)
Commonwealth Games medallists in athletics
Commonwealth Games silver medallists for Canada
Athletes (track and field) at the 1954 British Empire and Commonwealth Games
Medallists at the 1954 British Empire and Commonwealth Games